Graur is a surname. Notable people with the surname include:

Alexandru Graur (1900–1988), Romanian linguist
Dan Graur (born 1953), American scientist working in the fields of molecular evolution
Dinu Graur (born 1994), Moldovan footballer
Valeriu Graur (1940–2012), Moldovan activist and a political prisoner in the former Soviet Union